M. celebensis may refer to:

Miltasura celebensis, a moth species
Mimepuraecha celebensis, a beetle species
Mimomyromeus celebensis, a beetle species
Miratesta celebensis, a snail species
Mordella celebensis, a beetle species
Mordellistena celebensis, a beetle species
Myza celebensis, the dark-eared myza, a bird species